Moore v. Regents of the University of California was a landmark Supreme Court of California decision. Filed on July 9, 1990, it dealt with the issue of property rights to one's own cells taken in samples by doctors or researchers.

In 1976, John Moore was treated for hairy cell leukemia by physician David Golde, a cancer researcher at the UCLA Medical Center. Moore's cancer cells were later developed into a cell line that was commercialized by Golde and UCLA. The California Supreme Court ruled that a hospital patient's discarded blood and tissue samples are not his personal property and that individuals do not have rights to a share in the profits earned from commercial products or research derived from their cells.  Following this decision, most U.S. courts have ruled against family members who sue researchers and universities over the "improper commercialization" of their dead family member's body parts.

Background
John Moore first visited UCLA Medical Center on October 5, 1976, after he was diagnosed with hairy cell leukemia. Physician and cancer researcher David Golde took samples of Moore's blood, bone marrow, and other bodily fluids to confirm the diagnosis and recommended a splenectomy because of the potentially fatal amount of swelling in Moore's spleen. Moore signed a written consent form, authorizing the procedure. It said the hospital could "dispose of any severed tissue or member by cremation", and his spleen was removed by surgeons, who were not named as defendants, at UCLA Medical Center.

Moore's blood profile returned to normal after only a few days, and further examination of his spleen led Golde to discover that Moore's blood cells were unique in that they produced a protein that stimulated the growth of white blood cells, which help to protect the body from infections.

Moore moved to Seattle, Washington, after his surgery and returned to the UCLA Medical Center for follow-up visits with Golde several times, between 1976 and 1983. After a few years of traveling back to Los Angeles to see Golde and to have samples taken of bone marrow, blood, and semen, Moore asked about transferring his care to a doctor closer to home. In response, Golde offered to cover the expense of Moore's airfare and accommodations in Los Angeles, and Moore agreed to continue.

In 1983, Moore became suspicious about a new consent form he was asked to sign that said, "I (do, do not) voluntarily grant to the University of California all rights I, or my heirs, may have in any cell line or any other potential product which might be developed from the blood and/or bone marrow obtained from me". Moore initially signed the consent but refused at later visits and eventually gave the form to an attorney, who then discovered a patent on Moore's cell line, dubbed "Mo", which had been issued to the regents of UCLA in 1984. It named Golde and his research assistant as the inventors. Under an agreement with Genetics Institute, Golde became a paid consultant and acquired the rights to 75,000 shares of common stock in the patent. Genetics Institute also agreed to pay Golde and the regents at least $330,000 over three years, in exchange for exclusive access to the materials and research performed on the cell line and products derived from it.

Lawsuit
After learning of the patent, Moore filed a lawsuit for a share in the potential profits from products or research that had been derived from his cell line, without his knowledge or consent. Moore's lawsuit alleged that Golde had been aware of the potential for financial benefit when medical consent was obtained, but he had concealed that from Moore. The claim was rejected by the Los Angeles Superior Court, but in 1988, the California Court of Appeal ruled that blood and tissue samples were one's own personal property and that patients could have a right to share in profits derived from them.

According to the Los Angeles Times, "Moore later negotiated what he called a 'token' settlement with UCLA that covered his legal fees based on the fact that he wasn't informed and hadn't agreed to the research."

Issue
Moore brought suit against defendants Dr. David W. Golde, a physician who attended Moore at UCLA Medical Center; the Regents of the University of California, who own and operate the university; Shirley G. Quan, a researcher employed by the Regents; Genetics Institute, Inc.; and Sandoz Pharmaceuticals Corporation and related entities.

Decision
The court found that Moore had no property rights to his discarded cells or to any profits made from them. However, the research physician had an obligation to reveal his financial interest in the materials that were harvested from Moore, who could thus bring a claim for any injury that he sustained by the physician's failure to disclose his interests.

The opinion, written by Justice Edward Panelli, was joined by three of the seven judges of the Supreme Court of California.

The majority opinion first looked at Moore's claim of property interests under existing law. The court first rejected the argument that a person has an absolute right to the unique products of their body, as his products were not unique, as the cells are "no more unique to Moore than the number of vertebrae in the spine or the chemical formula of hemoglobin".

The court then rejected the argument that his spleen should be protected as property to protect Moore's privacy and dignity. The court held that his interests were already protected by informed consent and decided that since laws required the destruction of human organs as some indication, the legislature had intended to prevent patients from possessing their extracted organs. Finally, the property at issue may not have been Moore's cells but the cell line created from his cells.

The court then looked at the policy behind having Moore's cells considered property. Because conversion of property is a strict liability tort, the court feared that extending property rights to include organs would have a chilling effect on medical research. Laboratories doing research receive a large volume of medical samples and cannot be expected to know or discover whether somewhere down the line their samples were illegally converted. Furthermore, Moore's interest in his bodily integrity and privacy are protected by the requirement of informed consent, which must also inform about economic interests.

Justice Arabian wrote a concurring opinion, stating that the deep philosophical, moral and religious issues presented by the case could not be decided by the court.

Justice Broussard concurred in part and dissented in part.

Justice Mosk dissented, stating that Moore could have been denied some property rights and given others. At the very least,  Moore had the "right to do with his own tissue what the defendants did with it". That is, as soon as the tissue was removed, Moore had at least the right to choose to sell it to a laboratory or to have it destroyed. Thus, there would be no necessity to hold labs strictly liable for conversion when property rights could be broken up, to allow Moore to extract a significant portion of the economic value created by his tissue. Furthermore, to prove damages from informed consent, Moore would have to have proved that if he were properly informed, neither he, nor a reasonable person would have consented to the procedure. Thus, Moore's chances of proving damages through informed consent were slim. Also, he could not consent to the procedure but reserve the right to sell his organs. Finally, Moore could sue only his doctor, nobody else, for failing to adequately inform him. Thus, he was unlikely to win, could not extract the economic value of his tissue even if he had refused consent, and could not sue the parties that might be exploiting him.

Aftermath
Moore's cancer went into remission from 1976 to 1996 following the removal of his spleen. He died from the cancer in October 2001.

The Michael Crichton book Next, while specifically mentioning the case, extrapolates its possible legal ramifications with a patient, called Frank Burnet. Further, the 2010 book The Immortal Life of Henrietta Lacks by Rebecca Skloot and 2017 movie The Immortal Life of Henrietta Lacks (film) discuss this case and its precedent with regards to the Lacks Family.

See also
HeLa

References

Sources

External links
Full text opinion in HTML format - courtesy of California Continuing Education of the Bar
Full text opinion in PDF format (archived)
Case brief by LexisNexis

California state case law
Bioethics
1990 in United States case law
University of California litigation
1990 in California
United States property case law